Bobbili Junction railway station (station code:VBL) belongs to South Coast Railway of Waltair Division. It is located in Vizianagaram district of Andhra Pradesh state.

History

Between 1893 and 1896,  of the East Coast State Railway was opened for traffic. In 1898–99, Bengal Nagpur Railway was linked to the lines in southern India. The  Vizianagaram–Parvatipuram line was opened in 1908–09 and an extension to Salur was built in 1913. The Parvatipuram–Raipur line was completed in 1931.

Railway reorganization

The Bengal Nagpur Railway was nationalized in 1944.Eastern Railway was formed on 14 April 1952 with the portion of East Indian Railway Company east of Mughalsarai and the Bengal Nagpur Railway. In 1955, South Eastern Railway was carved out of Eastern Railway. It comprised lines mostly operated by BNR earlier. Amongst the new zones started in April 2003 were East Coast Railway  and South East Central Railway. Both these railways were carved out of South Eastern Railway. In 2019 East Coast Railway was bifurcated with Bobbili going to South Coast Railway

References

External links
 

Railway stations in Vizianagaram district
Railway stations in Waltair railway division